Joe Sydney Leesley (born 29 March 1994) is an English professional footballer who plays as a winger for  club Kidderminster Harriers. He previously played in the Football League for Stevenage and has played for England C, the team that represents the country at non-league level.

Career
Born in Sheffield, South Yorkshire, Leesley spent his early career with Winterton Rangers, Matlock Town, Alfreton Town, Harrogate Town and Stockport County, moving on loan to Stevenage on 6 January 2020. He made his debut two days later in the EFL Trophy. In November 2020 he moved on loan to Boston United. In June 2021, after Leesley agreed a season loan to Boston United, Harrogate manager Simon Weaver said he would be unlikely to play for his parent club again.

On 1 August 2022, Leesley signed for Boston United on a permanent deal having left Harrogate Town. In October, he joined league rivals Darlington on loan for a month. After an impressive seven-match spell during which he demonstrated versatility and leadership, both he and Darlington wanted to extend the loan, but Boston would only allow him to leave for a fee, which put him out of their reach. Leesley signed for another National North club, Kidderminster Harriers, on 18 November 2022, on a contract to run until the end of the 2023–24 season.

Career statistics

Honours
Harrogate Town
National League play-offs: 2020

References

1994 births
Living people
English footballers
England semi-pro international footballers
Association football wingers
Winterton Rangers F.C. players
Matlock Town F.C. players
Alfreton Town F.C. players
Harrogate Town A.F.C. players
Stockport County F.C. players
Stevenage F.C. players
Boston United F.C. players
Darlington F.C. players
Kidderminster Harriers F.C. players
English Football League players
National League (English football) players